David Pledger Madison (February 1, 1921 – December 8, 1985) was an American Major League Baseball pitcher who played in ,  and  for the New York Yankees, St. Louis Browns and Detroit Tigers. Born in Brooksville, Mississippi, he was an alumnus of Louisiana State University.

Madison's career as a professional baseball player extended from 1947–1955. Originally signed by the Yankees, he appeared in only one game for them, as a relief pitcher in the closing days of the 1950 season. He served in the United States Army during the Korean War in 1951 and was discharged in time for the 1952 season. On April 7, just prior to the opening of the 1952 baseball season, his contract was sold to the Browns. Madison then spent the entire seasons of 1952–53 in the big leagues with the Browns and Tigers, mostly as a relief pitcher, although he started six games.

In 74 total big-league games and 158 innings pitched, Madison allowed 173 hits and 103 bases on balls, with 70 strikeouts to his credit. He briefly managed in the lower levels of the Yankees' farm system, then served as a longtime scout.  He died in Macon, Mississippi, at age 64.

References

External links

1921 births
1985 deaths
United States Army personnel of the Korean War
Baltimore Orioles scouts
Baseball players from Mississippi
Bristol Twins players
Buffalo Bisons (minor league) players
Denver Bears players
Detroit Tigers players
Kansas City Blues (baseball) players
Louisiana State University alumni
Major League Baseball pitchers
Minor league baseball managers
New York Mets scouts
New York Yankees players
New York Yankees scouts
Oakland Athletics scouts
St. Louis Browns players
Sandersville Wacos players
People from Macon, Mississippi
People from Noxubee County, Mississippi